Robert Mills (born December 9, 1957) is a Canadian champion rower.

Mills was born in 1957 in Halifax, Nova Scotia. He won a bronze medal in the men's single sculls category at the 1984 Summer Olympics. He won a gold medal at the 1985 World Rowing Championships in men's quadruple sculls, and a bronze medal in the same event at the 1986 World Rowing Championships. He finished ninth in the same category at the 1988 Summer Olympics.

References

External links
 NSSHF: Robert Mills: Rowing World Champion

1957 births
Living people
Canadian male rowers
Olympic rowers of Canada
Sportspeople from Halifax, Nova Scotia
Rowers at the 1984 Summer Olympics
Rowers at the 1988 Summer Olympics
Olympic bronze medalists for Canada
Olympic medalists in rowing
Medalists at the 1984 Summer Olympics
Pan American Games medalists in rowing
Pan American Games gold medalists for Canada
World Rowing Championships medalists for Canada
Rowers at the 1983 Pan American Games